The churchie emerging art prize, formerly the churchie national emerging art prize and also known informally as the churchie, is a national Australian non-acquisitive art award and art exhibition, established in 1987.

History
The award was established in 1987 as an initiative of the Anglican Church Grammar School in Brisbane (known as "Churchie").

Brand + Slater Architects became the major prize sponsors from around 1998.

From 2010, the finalists were exhibited in the Griffith University Art Gallery (GUAG) at the Queensland College of Art in Brisbane. Its name was at that time "the churchie national emerging art prize".  GUAG established a partnership with the school, and staff members from the school sat on the Emerging Art Committee as well as developing educational materials to complement the exhibition, aimed at school-age students.

Description

Its aim is to help develop the careers of emerging artists. This term refers to artists who already have a body of work and some profile as an artist, but "not yet fully established in their artistic career".

All work in the exhibition is available for sale.

Past events and winners

2012: Guest judge Maura Reily
Major Prize Winner – Heath Franco
Highly Commended – Agatha Gothe-Snape
Highly commended – Sam Cranstoun
Highly commended – Genevieve Kemarr Loy
2013: Guest judge Roslyn Oxley; Peter McKay, Curator of QAGOMA, was on the finalists committee. Only 32 finalists were selected and included in the exhibition at GUAG, which was the smallest ever number until then.
Major prize – Amy Tam (aka Liberté Grace), for her video The Perfect Boy Myth (version 1)
commended – Becc Orszag, for three drawings
commended – Annika Koops, for her photograph Sissy
2014: Guest judge Alexie Glass-Kantor, Executive Director of ARTSPACE Visual Arts Centre in Sydney; 42 finalists
2015: Michaela Gleave
2016: Guest judge Kelly Gellatly, Director of the Ian Potter Museum of Art at the University of Melbourne
2021: Guest judge Rhana Devenport , Director of the Art Gallery of South Australia; exhibition curated by Grace Herbert.
Major prize – Nina Sanadze, Georgian-born artist now living in Melbourne, for Apotheosis, s sculptural work
Special Commendation Prize – Kyra Mancktelow, based in Brisbane
Commendation – Riana Head-Toussaint, based in Sydney
Commendation – Visaya Hoffie, based in Brisbane

References

External links

Australian art awards
1987 establishments in Australia